Rosha may refer to: 

 Robert S. Harris or RoSHa, video game programmer
 Rosha grass (Cymbopogon martinii), a species of grass